Fabio Fognini was the defending champion, but chose not to defend his title.

Guido Pella won his first ATP title, defeating Cristian Garín 7–5, 6–3 in the final.

Seeds
The top four seeds received a bye into the second round.

Draw

Finals

Top half

Bottom half

Qualifying

Seeds

Qualifiers

Qualifying draw

First qualifier

Second qualifier

Third qualifier

Fourth qualifier

References

 Main draw
 Qualifying draw

Singles